WJYS (channel 62) is an independent television station licensed to Hammond, Indiana, United States, serving the Chicago area. It is one of two commercial television stations in the Chicago market to be licensed in Indiana (alongside MyNetworkTV owned-and-operated station WPWR-TV [channel 50] in Gary). Owned by Millenial Telecommunications, Inc., WJYS maintains studio facilities on South Oak Park Avenue in Tinley Park, Illinois, and its transmitter is located atop the Willis Tower.

History
The station first signed on the air on March 2, 1991. It originally operated as a 24-hour-a-day home shopping station. In 1994, WJYS became more of a general entertainment station, picking up a number of syndicated programs. These shows included Laverne & Shirley, The Rifleman, The Odd Couple, Little House on the Prairie, Gunsmoke, Highway to Heaven and Matlock, along with older movies and anime programming, plus the Hoosier Lottery game show Hoosier Millionaire. By 1997, channel 62 was running infomercials and religious programming most of the day and by 2000, most of the entertainment shows were gone from the station. Today, WJYS offers both religious and secular paid programming.

Programming
The station's schedule primarily features local, national and international religious programming, along with paid programming (including long-form direct response, automobile dealer programs, and shows advertising local businesses). WJYS' locally-produced programs include Horace Smith, Salem Baptist Church, Charis Bible College, Triedstone Baptist Church, the jazz trio show Yvonne's Piano, Haitian Relief with Steve Munsey and Emmy Award-winning music show JBTV. WJYS also produced local commercials for Chicago State University.

Technical information

Subchannels
The station's digital signal is multiplexed:

Analog-to-digital conversion
WJYS shut down its analog signal, over UHF channel 62, on June 12, 2009, the official date in which full-power television stations in the United States transitioned from analog to digital broadcasts under federal mandate. The station's digital signal continued to broadcast on its pre-transition UHF channel 36. Through the use of PSIP, digital television receivers display the station's virtual channel as its former UHF analog channel 62, which was among the high band UHF channels (52-69) that were removed from broadcasting use as a result of the transition.

Unlike the analog transmitter once located in Tinley Park, WJYS-DT has a transmitter atop the Willis Tower on channel 36, allowing for greater signal coverage. The WJYS signal during the analog television era reached approximately 7.5 million people in the Chicago metropolitan area, expanding to nearly 11 million households across Illinois, Indiana, Wisconsin and Michigan following the June 2009 digital transition as its digital transmitter facilities on Willis Tower replicated the coverage area of the major broadcast stations in the market.

References

External links
 

Hammond, Indiana
Television channels and stations established in 1991
1991 establishments in Indiana
JYS
Independent television stations in the United States
Stadium (sports network) affiliates
Charge! (TV network) affiliates
Heartland (TV network) affiliates
Comet (TV network) affiliates